Juan Landázuri Ricketts (December 19, 1913, Arequipa, Peru – January 16, 1997, Lima, Peru) was one of the most prominent Roman Catholic Churchmen during the 1960s and 1970s in Latin America. This was a period in which the Church took a strong stance against human rights abuses by numerous military juntas; it also expressed a preference for the poor and concerns about extreme poverty and wealth inequality. Before he turned 80 on December 19, 1993, Juan Landázuri Ricketts was the last Cardinal elevated by Pope John XXIII to retain voting rights in a papal conclave.

Early life
Born as Guillermo Eduardo Landázuri Ricketts in 1913 in Arequipa, Peru, he was educated in Catholic schools. He joined the Order of Friars Minor in 1937 (taking the name Juan) and became a priest two years later. His ability as a priest was immediately noticed, and he was appointed as secretary to the general delegation of his order as early as 1943. After finishing his theological studies in 1949, Landázuri Ricketts served briefly a faculty member of the Franciscan Theological Seminary in Puerto Ocopa. His status within the wider Church was rising rapidly, and he was selected as the general definitor of the Order of Friars Minor by 1951.

Archbishop of Lima
The following year, Landázuri Ricketts was appointed titular bishop of Roina and was chosen in 1955 to replace the deceased Juan Gualberto Guevara as Archbishop of Lima. His appointment coincided with a radically modernising military dictatorship under Manuel Odria. Efforts at such reform were repeated until 1980. As Archbishop, he collaborated with these efforts for sweeping agricultural and institutional reforms to take Peru into the modern world and develop its great economic potential. He believed that these would improve social conditions in the country. By 1962 he had been selected as Primate of Peru and was made a Cardinal-Priest of Santa Maria in Aracoeli by Pope John XXIII in June 1962. 

He made great efforts, aided by the Jesuits in Peru, to consolidate the vast archives of the Lima Archdiocese. These had accumulated since Spanish colonisation of Latin America and were invaluable sources of the history of the region.

Liberation theology
In the following period Landázuri Ricketts led during a period when priests rapidly developed liberation theology and a theory of resistance to the military dictatorship under Ricardo Perez Godoy who ruled Peru. Landázuri Ricketts responded to this with considerable support, also trying to ensure that the laity and nuns had considerable say in local decision-making. He became a major participant as Acting President in the 1968 Medellin Conference. He was regularly elected as the leader of local episcopal conference almost without opposition until he reached the age of 75 in 1988. 

During this period, in accordance with his Franciscan ideals, Landázuri Ricketts left the Archbishop's palace and moved into a small house in a working-class area of Lima. Although he served on the Pontifical Council for Interreligious Dialogue during the 1970s, his relationship with the Vatican soured after the ascension of John Paul II. That pope believed that liberation theology posed problems for Catholicism and was too involved in opposition to temporal political systems. Despite being an extremely respected prelate, Landázuri Ricketts had to accept more conservative Opus Dei bishops and sympathisers being appointed in Peru during the 1980s and 1990s. 

Due to his advancing age, he resigned his role as head of the South American Bishops' conference in 1989. He retired from the see in 1990 and was succeeded by Augusto Vargas Alzamora.

References

External links
 The Church and the Military
  Picture of Cardinal Landázuri Ricketts in Franciscan cappa magna

1913 births
1997 deaths
People from Arequipa
Peruvian people of Basque descent
Peruvian Friars Minor
20th-century Roman Catholic archbishops in Peru
Peruvian people of British descent
Participants in the Second Vatican Council
Roman Catholic archbishops of Lima
Peruvian cardinals
Cardinals created by Pope John XXIII
Burials at the Cathedral of Lima
Franciscan cardinals